A stripe is a line or band that differs in color or tone from an adjacent area. Stripes are a group of such lines.

Usage and appearance
As a pattern (more than one stripe together), stripes are commonly seen in nature, food, emblems, clothing, and elsewhere.

Two-toned stripes inherently draw one's attention, and as such are used to signal hazards. They are used in road signs, barricade tape, and thresholds.

In nature, as with the zebra, stripes may have developed through natural selection to produce motion dazzle.

Stripes may give appeal to certain sweets like the candy cane.

For hundreds of years, stripes have been used in clothing. Striped clothing has frequently had negative symbolism in Western cultures. Historian Michel Pastoureau explores the cultural history of these design decisions in the book, The Devil's Cloth.

See also 
 Square tiling
Sussi cloth
The Devil's Cloth
 Argyle (pattern)
 Racing flags
 Flannel
 Gingham
 Madras (cloth)
 Plaid (pattern)
 Polka dot
 Tartan
 Tattersall (cloth)
 Diapering

References

External links 

Patterns
Geometric shapes